Sree Narayana College, Kannur is a post-graduate college affiliated to the Kannur University in India.

Notable alumni

 Sahal Abdul Samad, Indian International footballer
 Prakash Bare, Indian film actor
 C. K. Vineeth, Indian footballer
 Manju Warrier, Malayalam film actress
 Rayshad Rauf, playback singer
 Sanusha, Malayalam film actress
 Sayanora Philip, playback singer

Courses offered
 B.A

 B.Com
 B.Sc
 M.A. in Economics
 M.A. in English
 M.Com. With Accountancy and Finance
 M.Sc. Chemistry
 M.Sc. Physics
 M.Sc. Zoology(Parasitology)

Ph.D. programs
 Zoology
 Chemistry
 Commerce
 Botany

References

Colleges affiliated to Kannur University
Universities and colleges in Kannur district